Charlie Harrison was an English footballer who played as a full back for Manchester United.

References

English footballers
Manchester United F.C. players
Association football fullbacks
Football Alliance players
Year of birth missing
Year of death missing